The 1937 Plymouth Drake by-election was held on 15 June 1937.  The by-election was held due to the death of the incumbent Conservative MP, Frederick Guest.  It was won by the Conservative candidate Henry Guest, an elder brother of Frederick.

References

1937 in England
Elections in Plymouth, Devon
1937 elections in the United Kingdom
By-elections to the Parliament of the United Kingdom in Devon constituencies
20th century in Plymouth, Devon
1930s in Devon